Stożnowo  is a village in the administrative district of Gmina Jaświły, within Mońki County, Podlaskie Voivodeship, in north-eastern Poland.

The village has a population of 30.

References

Villages in Mońki County